James Rae may refer to:

Jimmy Rae (died 1958), Scottish football player and manager (Partick Thistle, Plymouth Argyle)
Jim Rae (basketball) (1917–2013), American professional basketball player
 James Rae (surgeon) (1716–1791), Scottish surgeon
 James Rae, actor in The Paperboy (1994 film)
 Jim Rae, radio host on CBW (AM)

See also
James Ray (disambiguation)
John Rae (footballer, born 1862), Scottish footballer for Third Lanark, Sunderland Albion, Scotland – sometimes misidentified as Jim Rae